Rhopalocarpus undulatus is a tree in the family Sphaerosepalaceae. It is endemic to Madagascar.

Distribution and habitat
Rhopalocarpus undulatus is known only from eight locations in the northern regions of Diana and Sava. It is present and protected in the Ankarana Special Reserve.

Threats
Rhopalocarpus undulatus is threatened by shifting patterns of agriculture. Because the species is used as timber, subsistence harvesting is also a threat. Wildfires also threaten the species.

References

undulatus
Endemic flora of Madagascar
Trees of Madagascar
Plants described in 1962
Taxa named by René Paul Raymond Capuron